Krosswindz (Bengali: ক্রসউইন্ডস) is a Bengali rock/folk-fusion band, based in Kolkata, India. They have played all over India and abroad, and have helped urbanize the folk music of Bengal and have tried to make it popular. Krosswindz is one of the few Kolkata based Bengali rock bands who have female singers in their lead vocals.

History 
The band was formed in 1990, and started out playing at college festivals. Today, they have toured all over India and have played at all major college festivals and stadium concerts. The band has performed and collaborated with internationally reputed names like Herbie Hancock (USA), Sky High (Sweden), Tizian Jost (Germany), Pandit Ramesh Mishra (Indian Sarangi Player) and The Jazz Ambassadors (USA). The band's music has been featured in numerous documentary films and commercials.

Members 
 Vikramjit (Tuki) Banerjee - Lead guitars, vocals, songwriter, producer (also worked with Bhoomi)
 Chandrani Banerjee - Lead vocals, Songwriter (also worked with Bhoomi)
 Ratanjit - Keyboards, Indian folk instruments

Discography

Collaboration albums
Aabaar Bochhor Kuri Pore (1995)

References

Further reading

External links 
 Official Website
 Facebook Fanpage

Bengali music
Bengali musicians
Musical groups established in 1990